Kandra is a village in Ketugram I CD block in Katwa subdivision of Purba Bardhaman district in the state of West Bengal, India.

Geography

CD block HQ
The headquarters of Ketugram I CD block are located at Kandra.

Urbanisation
88.44% of the population of Katwa subdivision live in the rural areas. Only 11.56% of the population live in the urban areas. The map alongside presents some of the notable locations in the subdivision. All places marked in the map are linked in the larger full screen map.

Demographics
As per the 2011 Census of India Kandara had a total population of 11,534, of which 5,894 (51%) were males and 5,640 (49%) were females. Population below 6 years was 1,311. The total number of literates in Kandara was 7,238 (70.80% of the population over 6 years).

Transport
The State Highway 6, running from Rajnagar (in Birbhum district) to Alampur in (Howrah district), passes through Kandra.

Education
Kandra Radha Kanta Kundu Mahavidyalaya, established in 2001, is affiliated to the University of Burdwan. It offers honours courses in Bengali, English, Sanskrit, history and geography.

Kandra JM High School was established in 1926.

Culture
Jnandas, a Vaishnava poet, was born around 1520-1535 at Kandra and the temple where he worshipped still attracts devotees. A fair is organised in his memory during Paush Purnima. Katakadas Khemananda (17th century), a poet influenced by Chaitanya Mahaprabhu, was born at Kandra.

Healthcare
Ramjibanpur Rural Hospital at Ramjibanpur, PO Jnandas Kandra (with 30 beds) is the main medical facility in Ketugram I CD block. There are primary health centres at Ankhona (with 2 beds) and Pandugram, PO Khatundi (with 10 beds).

See also - Healthcare in West Bengal

References

Villages in Purba Bardhaman district